The 2021–22 Toronto Maple Leafs season was the 105th season for the National Hockey League franchise that was established on November 22, 1917. On April 9, 2022, the Maple Leafs clinched a playoff spot with a 3–2 win against the Montreal Canadiens. With a 4–2 win over the New York Islanders on April 17, the Maple Leafs set franchise records in both wins (50) and points (106). The Maple Leafs qualified for the playoffs for the sixth consecutive season but they were upset in the first round by the two-time defending Stanley Cup champion Tampa Bay Lightning, losing in seven games, despite leading the series 3 games to 2 with a 3–2 lead after the 2nd period of Game 6. With the Florida Panthers winning a playoff series for the first time since 1996, Toronto now holds the NHL's longest active playoff series win drought, not having won a playoff series since 2004.

Standings

Record vs opponents

Notes
 Game decided in overtime
 Game decided in a shootout

Schedule and results

Preseason

|- style="background:#cfc;"
| 1 || September 25 || Montreal Canadiens || 4–1 || || Hutchinson (1–0–0) || Scotiabank Arena || — || 1–0–0 || 
|- style="background:#fcc;"
| 2 || September 27 || @ Montreal Canadiens || 2–5 || || Campbell (0–1–0) || Bell Centre || 7,500 || 1–1–0 || 
|- style="background:#cfc;"
| 3 || September 29 || @ Ottawa Senators || 4–0 || || Mrazek (1–0–0) || Canadian Tire Centre || — || 2–1–0 || 
|- style="background:#cfc;"
| 4 || October 4 || @ Ottawa Senators || 3–1 || || Campbell (1–1–0) || Canadian Tire Centre || — || 3–1–0 || 
|- style="background:#cfc;"
| 5 || October 5 || Montreal Canadiens || 6–2 || || Mrazek (2–0–0) || Scotiabank Arena || — || 4–1–0 || 
|- style="background:#cfc;"
| 6 || October 9 || Ottawa Senators || 4–1 || || Campbell (2–1–0) || Scotiabank Arena || — || 5–1–0 || 
|-

Regular season

|- style="background:#cfc;"
| 1 || October 13 || Montreal Canadiens || 2–1 || || Campbell (1–0–0) || Scotiabank Arena || 18,493 || 1–0–0 || 2 || 
|- style="background:#fcc;"
| 2 || October 14 || @ Ottawa Senators || 2–3 || || Mrazek (0–1–0) || Canadian Tire Centre || 15,159 || 1–1–0 || 2 || 
|- style="background:#cfc;"
| 3 || October 16 || Ottawa Senators || 3–1 || || Campbell (2–0–0) || Scotiabank Arena || 18,211 || 2–1–0 || 4 || 
|- style="background:#ffc;"
| 4 || October 18 || New York Rangers || 1–2 || OT || Campbell (2–0–1) || Scotiabank Arena || 18,098 || 2–1–1 || 5 || 
|- style="background:#fcc;"
| 5 || October 22 || San Jose Sharks || 3–5 || || Hutchinson (0–1–0) || Scotiabank Arena || 18,603 || 2–2–1 || 5 || 
|- style="background:#fcc;"
| 6 || October 23 || @ Pittsburgh Penguins || 1–7 || || Campbell (2–1–1) || PPG Paints Arena || 15,397 || 2–3–1 || 5 || 
|- style="background:#fcc;"
| 7 || October 25 || @ Carolina Hurricanes || 1–4 || || Campbell (2–2–1) || PNC Arena || 14,011 || 2–4–1 || 5 || 
|- style="background:#cfc;"
| 8 || October 27 || @ Chicago Blackhawks || 3–2 || OT || Campbell (3–2–1) || United Center || 18,616 || 3–4–1 || 7 || 
|- style="background:#cfc;"
| 9 || October 30 || Detroit Red Wings || 5–4 || || Mrazek (1–1–0) || Scotiabank Arena || 18,921 || 4–4–1 || 9 || 
|-

|- style="background:#cfc;"
| 10 || November 2 || Vegas Golden Knights || 4–0 || || Campbell (4–2–1) || Scotiabank Arena || 18,689 || 5–4–1 || 11 || 
|- style="background:#cfc;"
| 11 || November 4 || Tampa Bay Lightning || 2–1 || OT || Campbell (5–2–1) || Scotiabank Arena || 18,937 || 6–4–1 || 13 || 
|- style="background:#cfc;"
| 12 || November 6 || Boston Bruins || 5–2 || || Campbell (6–2–1) || Scotiabank Arena || 19,077 || 7–4–1 || 15 || 
|- style="background:#fcc;"
| 13 || November 8 || Los Angeles Kings || 1–5 || || Campbell (6–3–1) || Scotiabank Arena || 18,983 || 7–5–1 || 15 || 
|- style="background:#cfc;"
| 14 || November 10 || @ Philadelphia Flyers || 3–0 || || Campbell (7–3–1) || Wells Fargo Center || 17,997 || 8–5–1 || 17 || 
|- style="background:#cfc;"
| 15 || November 12 || Calgary Flames || 2–1 || OT || Campbell (8–3–1) || Scotiabank Arena || 18,826 || 9–5–1 || 19 || 
|- style="background:#cfc;"
| 16 || November 13 || @ Buffalo Sabres || 5–4 || || Woll (1–0–0) || KeyBank Center || 7,992 || 10–5–1 || 21 || 
|- style="background:#cfc;"
| 17 || November 16 || Nashville Predators || 3–0 || || Campbell (9–3–1) || Scotiabank Arena || 18,949 || 11–5–1 || 23 || 
|- style="background:#cfc;"
| 18 || November 18 || New York Rangers || 2–1 || || Campbell (10–3–1) || Scotiabank Arena || 19,029 || 12–5–1 || 25 || 
|- style="background:#fcc;"
| 19 || November 20 || Pittsburgh Penguins || 0–2 || || Campbell (10–4–1) || Scotiabank Arena || 19,531 || 12–6–1 || 25 || 
|- style="background:#cfc;"
| 20 || November 21 || @ New York Islanders || 3–0 || || Woll (2–0–0) || UBS Arena || 17,255 || 13–6–1 || 27 || 
|- style="background:#cfc;"
| 21 || November 24 || @ Los Angeles Kings || 6–2 || || Campbell (11–4–1) || Staples Center || 15,166 || 14–6–1 || 29 || 
|- style="background:#cfc;"
| 22 || November 26 || @ San Jose Sharks  || 4–1 || || Woll (3–0–0) || SAP Center || 14,068 || 15–6–1 || 31 || 
|- style="background:#cfc;"
| 23 || November 28 || @ Anaheim Ducks || 5–1 || || Campbell (12–4–1) || Honda Center || 13,664 || 16–6–1 || 33 || 
|-

|- style="background:#cfc;"
| 24 || December 1 || Colorado Avalanche || 8–3 || || Campbell (13–4–1) || Scotiabank Arena || 18,931 || 17–6–1 || 35 || 
|- style="background:#ffc;"
| 25 || December 4 || @ Minnesota Wild || 3–4 || SO || Campbell (13–4–2) || Xcel Energy Center || 18,568 || 17–6–2 || 36 || 
|- style="background:#fcc;"
| 26 || December 5 || @ Winnipeg Jets || 3–6 || || Woll (3–1–0) || Canada Life Centre || 14,461 || 17–7–2 || 36 || 
|- style="background:#cfc;"
| 27 || December 7 || Columbus Blue Jackets || 5–4 || || Campbell (14–4–2) || Scotiabank Arena || 18,793 || 18–7–2 || 38 || 
|- style="background:#fcc;"
| 28 || December 9 || Tampa Bay Lightning || 3–5 || || Campbell (14–5–2) || Scotiabank Arena || 18,919 || 18–8–2 || 38 || 
|- style="background:#cfc;"
| 29 || December 11 || Chicago Blackhawks || 5–4 || || Mrazek (2–1–0) || Scotiabank Arena || 18,934 || 19–8–2 || 40 || 
|- style="background:#cfc;"
| 30 || December 14 || @ Edmonton Oilers || 5–1 || || Campbell (15–5–2)  || Rogers Place || 18,131 || 20–8–2 || 42 || 
|- style="background:#ccc;"
| — || December 16 || @ Calgary Flames || – || colspan="7"|Postponed due to COVID-19. Rescheduled for February 10.
|- style="background:#ccc;"
| — || December 18 || @ Vancouver Canucks || – || colspan="7"|Postponed due to COVID-19. Rescheduled for February 12.
|- style="background:#ccc;"
| — || December 19 || @ Seattle Kraken || – || colspan="7"|Postponed due to COVID-19. Rescheduled for February 14.
|- style="background:#ccc;"
| — || December 23 || St. Louis Blues || – || colspan="7"|Postponed due to COVID-19. Rescheduled for February 19.
|- style="background:#ccc;"
| — || December 27 || @ Columbus Blue Jackets || – || colspan="7"|Postponed due to COVID-19. Rescheduled for February 22.
|- style="background:#ccc;"
| — || December 29 || Pittsburgh Penguins || – || colspan="7"|Postponed due to COVID-19. Rescheduled for February 17.
|-

|- style="background:#cfc;"
| 31 || January 1 || Ottawa Senators || 6–0 || || Campbell (16–5–2) || Scotiabank Arena || 989 || 21–8–2 || 44 || 
|- style="background:#ccc;"
| — || January 3 || Carolina Hurricanes || – || colspan="7"|Postponed due to attendance restrictions. Rescheduled for February 7.
|- style="background:#cfc;"
| 32 || January 5 || Edmonton Oilers || 4–2 || || Campbell (17–5–2) || Scotiabank Arena || 0 || 22–8–2 || 46 || 
|- style="background:#ccc;"
| — || January 6 || @ Montreal Canadiens || – || colspan="7"|Postponed due to attendance restrictions. Rescheduled for February 21.
|- style="background:#ffc;"
| 33 || January 8 || @ Colorado Avalanche || 4–5 || OT || Campbell (17–5–3) || Ball Arena || 17,354 || 22–8–3 || 47 || 
|- style="background:#cfc;"
| 34 || January 11 || @ Vegas Golden Knights || 4–3 || SO || Campbell (18–5–3) || T-Mobile Arena || 17,911 || 23–8–3 || 49 || 
|- style="background:#fcc;"
| 35 || January 12 || @ Arizona Coyotes || 1–2 ||  || Mrazek (2–2–0) || Gila River Arena || 10,031 || 23–9–3 || 49 || 
|- style="background:#cfc;"
| 36 || January 15 || @ St. Louis Blues || 6–5 ||  || Campbell (19–5–3) || Enterprise Center || 18,096 || 24–9–3 || 51 || 
|- style="background:#ccc;"
| — || January 17 || New Jersey Devils || – || colspan="7"|Postponed due to attendance restrictions. Rescheduled for January 31
|- style="background:#fcc;"
| 37 || January 19 || @ New York Rangers || 3–6 ||  || Campbell (19–6–3) || Madison Square Garden || 16,624 || 24–10–3 || 51 || 
|- style="background:#cfc;"
| 38 || January 22 || @ New York Islanders || 3–1 ||  || Mrazek (3–2–0) || UBS Arena || 17,255 || 25–10–3 || 53 || 
|- style="background:#cfc;"
| 39 || January 26 || Anaheim Ducks || 4–3 || SO || Campbell (20–6–3) || Scotiabank Arena || 0 || 26–10–3 || 55 || 
|- style="background:#cfc;"
| 40 || January 29 || @ Detroit Red Wings || 7–4 ||  || Mrazek (4–2–0) || Little Caesars Arena || 19,515 || 27–10–3 || 57 || 
|- style="background:#cfc;"
| 41 || January 31 || New Jersey Devils || 6–4 ||  || Mrazek (5–2–0) || Scotiabank Arena || 500 || 28–10–3 || 59 || 
|-

|- style="background:#cfc;"
| 42 || February 1 || @ New Jersey Devils || 7–1 ||  || Campbell (21–6–3) || Prudential Center || 11,602 || 29–10–3 || 61 || 
|- style="background:#cfc;"
| 43 || February 7 || Carolina Hurricanes || 4–3 || OT || Mrazek (6–2–0) || Scotiabank Arena || 500 || 30–10–3 || 63 || 
|- style="background:#fcc;"
| 44 || February 10 || @ Calgary Flames || 2–5 ||  || Campbell (21–7–3) || Scotiabank Saddledome || 9,639 || 30–11–3 || 63 || 
|- style="background:#fcc;"
| 45 || February 12 || @ Vancouver Canucks || 2–3 ||  || Mrazek (6–3–0) || Rogers Arena || 9,396 || 30–12–3 || 63 || 
|- style="background:#cfc;"
| 46 || February 14 || @ Seattle Kraken || 6–2 ||  || Campbell (22–7–3) || Climate Pledge Arena || 17,151 || 31–12–3 || 65 || 
|- style="background:#cfc;"
| 47 || February 17 || Pittsburgh Penguins || 4–1 ||  || Campbell (23–7–3) || Scotiabank Arena || 8,139 || 32–12–3 || 67 || 
|- style="background:#fcc;"
| 48 || February 19 || St. Louis Blues || 3–6 ||  || Campbell (23–8–3) || Scotiabank Arena || 9,098 || 32–13–3 || 67 || 
|- style="background:#fcc;"
| 49 || February 21 || @ Montreal Canadiens || 2–5 ||  || Mrazek (6–4–0) || Bell Centre || 10,552 || 32–14–3 || 67 || 
|- style="background:#ffc;"
| 50 || February 22 || @ Columbus Blue Jackets || 3–4 || OT || Campbell (23–8–4) || Nationwide Arena || 15,489 || 32–14–4 || 68 || 
|- style="background:#cfc;"
| 51 || February 24 || Minnesota Wild || 3–1 ||  || Mrazek (7–4–0) || Scotiabank Arena || 9,410 || 33–14–4 || 70 || 
|- style="background:#cfc;"
| 52 || February 26 || @ Detroit Red Wings || 10–7 ||  || Mrazek (8–4–0) || Little Caesars Arena || 18,791 || 34–14–4 || 72 || 
|- style="background:#cfc;"
| 53 || February 28 || @ Washington Capitals || 5–3 ||  || Mrazek (9–4–0) || Capital One Arena || 18,573 || 35–14–4 || 74 || 
|-

|- style="background:#fcc;"
| 54 || March 2 || Buffalo Sabres || 1–5 ||  || Mrazek (9–5–0) || Scotiabank Arena || 17,122 || 35–15–4 || 74 || 
|- style="background:#fcc;"
| 55 || March 5 || Vancouver Canucks || 4–6 ||  || Campbell (23–9–4) || Scotiabank Arena || 17,534 || 35–16–4 || 74 || 
|- style="background:#cfc;"
| 56 || March 7 || @ Columbus Blue Jackets || 5–4 ||  || Mrazek (10–5–0) || Nationwide Arena || 14,252 || 36–16–4 || 76 || 
|- style="background:#cfc;"
| 57 || March 8 || Seattle Kraken || 6–4 ||  || Campbell (24–9–4) || Scotiabank Arena || 17,547 || 37–16–4 || 78 || 
|- style="background:#ffc;"
| 58 || March 10 || Arizona Coyotes || 4–5 || OT || Kallgren (0–0–1) || Scotiabank Arena || 17,351 || 37–16–5 || 79 || 
|- style="background:#fcc;"
| 59 || March 13 || @ Buffalo Sabres || 2–5 ||  || Mrazek (10–6–0) || Tim Hortons Field || 26,119(outdoors) || 37–17–5 || 79 || 
|- style="background:#cfc;"
| 60 || March 15 || Dallas Stars || 4–0 ||  || Kallgren (1–0–1) || Scotiabank Arena || 18,543 || 38–17–5 || 81 || 
|- style="background:#cfc;"
| 61 || March 17 || Carolina Hurricanes || 3–2 ||  || Kallgren (2–0–1) || Scotiabank Arena || 18,134 || 39–17–5 || 83 || 
|- style="background:#fcc;"
| 62 || March 19 || @ Nashville Predators || 3–6 ||  || Kallgren (2–1–1) || Bridgestone Arena || 17,692 || 39–18–5 || 83 || 
|- style="background:#cfc;"
| 63 || March 23 || New Jersey Devils || 3–2 ||  || Mrazek (11–6–0) || Scotiabank Arena || 18,739 || 40–18–5 || 85 || 
|- style="background:#fcc;"
| 64 || March 26 || @ Montreal Canadiens || 2–4 ||  || Kallgren (2–2–1) || Bell Centre || 21,105 || 40–19–5 || 85 || 
|- style="background:#cfc;"
| 65 || March 27 || Florida Panthers || 5–2 ||  || Mrazek (12–6–0) || Scotiabank Arena || 18,939 || 41–19–5 || 87 || 
|- style="background:#cfc;"
| 66 || March 29 || @ Boston Bruins || 6–4 ||  || Kallgren (3–2–1) || TD Garden || 17,850 || 42–19–5 || 89 || 
|- style="background:#cfc;"
| 67 || March 31 || Winnipeg Jets || 7–3 ||  || Kallgren (4–2–1) || Scotiabank Arena || 18,517 || 43–19–5 || 91 || 
|-

|- style="background:#cfc;"
| 68 || April 2 || @ Philadelphia Flyers || 6–3 ||  || Campbell (25–9–4) || Wells Fargo Center || 17,097 || 44–19–5 || 93 || 
|- style="background:#cfc;"
| 69 || April 4 || @ Tampa Bay Lightning || 6–2 ||  || Campbell (26–9–4) || Amalie Arena || 19,092 || 45–19–5 || 95 || 
|- style="background:#ffc;"
| 70 || April 5 || @ Florida Panthers || 6–7 || OT || Campbell (26–9–5) || FLA Live Arena || 15,260 || 45–19–6 || 96 || 
|- style="background:#cfc;"
| 71 || April 7 || @ Dallas Stars || 4–3 || OT || Campbell (27–9–5) || American Airlines Center || 18,012 || 46–19–6 || 98 || 
|- style="background:#cfc;"
| 72 || April 9 || Montreal Canadiens || 3–2 ||  || Kallgren (5–2–1) || Scotiabank Arena || 19,113 || 47–19–6 || 100 || 
|- style="background:#fcc;"
| 73 || April 12 || Buffalo Sabres || 2–5 ||  || Kallgren (5–3–1) || Scotiabank Arena || 18,393 || 47–20–6 || 100 || 
|- style="background:#cfc;"
| 74 || April 14 || Washington Capitals || 7–3 ||  || Campbell (28–9–5) || Scotiabank Arena || 18,466 || 48–20–6 || 102 || 
|- style="background:#cfc;"
| 75 || April 16 || @ Ottawa Senators || 5–4 || OT || Kallgren (6–3–1) || Canadian Tire Centre || 18,655 || 49–20–6 || 104 || 
|- style="background:#cfc;"
| 76 || April 17 || New York Islanders || 4–2 ||  || Campbell (29–9–5) || Scotiabank Arena || 17,464 || 50–20–6 || 106 || 
|- style="background:#cfc;"
| 77 || April 19 || Philadelphia Flyers || 5–2 ||  || Campbell (30–9–5) || Scotiabank Arena || 18,291 || 51–20–6 || 108 || 
|- style="background:#fcc;"
| 78 || April 21 || @ Tampa Bay Lightning || 1–8 ||  || Kallgren (6–4–1) || Amalie Arena || 19,092 || 51–21–6 || 108 || 
|- style="background:#ffc;"
| 79 || April 23 || @ Florida Panthers || 2–3 || OT || Campbell (30–9–6) || FLA Live Arena || 17,132 || 51–21–7 || 109 || 
|- style="background:#cfc;"
| 80 || April 24 || @ Washington Capitals || 4–3 || SO || Kallgren (7–4–1) || Capital One Arena || 18,573 || 52–21–7 || 111 || 
|- style="background:#cfc;"
| 81 || April 26 || Detroit Red Wings || 3–0 ||  || Campbell (31–9–6) || Scotiabank Arena || 18,107 || 53–21–7 || 113 || 
|- style="background:#cfc;"
| 82 || April 29 || Boston Bruins || 5–2 ||  || Kallgren (8–4–1) || Scotiabank Arena || 18,219 || 54–21–7 || 115 || 
|-

|-
| 2021–22 schedule

Overtime statistics

Playoffs

|- style="background:#cfc;"
| 1 || May 2 || Tampa Bay Lightning || 5–0 ||  || Campbell (1–0) || Scotiabank Arena || 19,338 || 1–0 || 
|- style="background:#fcc;"
| 2 || May 4 || Tampa Bay Lightning || 3–5 ||  || Campbell (1–1) || Scotiabank Arena || 19,135 || 1–1 || 
|- style="background:#cfc;"
| 3 || May 6 || @ Tampa Bay Lightning || 5–2 ||  || Campbell (2–1) || Amalie Arena || 19,092 || 2–1 || 
|- style="background:#fcc;"
| 4 || May 8 || @ Tampa Bay Lightning || 3–7 ||  || Campbell (2–2) || Amalie Arena || 19,092 || 2–2 || 
|- style="background:#cfc;"
| 5 || May 10 || Tampa Bay Lightning || 4–3 ||  || Campbell (3–2) || Scotiabank Arena || 19,434 || 3–2 || 
|- style="background:#fcc;"
| 6 || May 12 || @ Tampa Bay Lightning || 3–4 || OT || Campbell (3–3) || Amalie Arena || 19,092 || 3–3 || 
|- style="background:#fcc;"
| 7 || May 14 || Tampa Bay Lightning || 1–2  ||  || Campbell (3–4)  || Scotiabank Arena || 19,316 || 3–4 || 
|-

|-
|

Player statistics

Skaters

Goaltenders

(M) Player was playing for the minor league affiliate Toronto Marlies of the AHL at end of regular season
(X) Player is no longer with the Maple Leafs organization 
(p) Player previously played with another team before being acquired by Toronto
Bold/italics denotes franchise record.

Transactions
The Maple Leafs have been involved in the following transactions during the 2021–22 season.

Trades

Notes:
  Minnesota will receive a seventh-round pick in 2022 if Mennell plays 30 games for Toronto in 2021–22; otherwise no pick will be exchanged.

Players acquired

Players lost

Signings

Draft picks

Below are the Toronto Maple Leafs' selections at the 2021 NHL Entry Draft, which were held on July 23 to 24, 2021. It was held virtually via Video conference call from the NHL Network studio in Secaucus, New Jersey.

References

Toronto Maple Leafs seasons
Maple Leafs
Maple Leafs
Toronto Maple Leafs season
Toronto Maple Leafs season